African blue basil (Ocimum kilimandscharicum × basilicum 'Dark Opal') is a hybrid basil variety, a cross between camphor basil and dark opal basil. It is one of a few types of basil that are perennial. African blue basil plants are sterile, unable to produce seeds of their own, and can only be propagated by cuttings.

This particular breed of basil has a strong camphor scent, inherited from Ocimum kilimandscharicum (camphor basil), its East African parent. The concentration of camphor is 22% (compared with 61% for O. kilimandscharicum).  The concentration of the other major aroma compounds, linalool (55%), and 1,8-cineole (15%) is comparable to many basil cultivars.

All parts of the flower, leaves and stems are edible; although some might find the camphor scent too strong for use in the kitchen, the herb reportedly yields a tasty pesto with a "rich, mellow flavor" and can be used as a seasoning in soups and salads, particularly those featuring tomato, green beans, chicken, etc.

The leaves of African blue basil start out purple when young, only growing green as the given leaf grows to its full size, and even then retaining purple veins. Based on other purple basils, the color is from anthocyanins, especially cyanidin-3-(di-p-coumarylglucoside)-5-glucoside, but also other cyanidin-based and peonidin-based compounds.

It blooms profusely like an annual, but being sterile can never go to seed. It is also taller than many basil cultivars. These blooms are very good at attracting bees and other pollinators.

See also
 List of basil cultivars

References

Ocimum
Herbs